The Porvenir Formation is a geologic formation exposed in the southeastern Sangre de Cristo Mountains of New Mexico. It preserves fossils dating back to the middle Pennsylvanian period.

Description
The formation is mostly marine and can be divided into three intergrading facies. The first, located primarily to the south, is mostly limestone with some interbedded shale and sandstone. The second facies, located to the north and northwest, is mostly gray shale with some thick limestone and thin sandstone beds. The third facies, found to the northeast, is mostly shale, limestone (including sandy and oolitic limestone) and arkosic sandstone.

The formation rests conformably on the Sandia Formation and is disconformably overlain by the Alamitos Formation.

Fossils
The formation contains fusulinids of Desmoinesian (Moscovian) age.

History of investigation
The formation was first named by Baltz and Myers in 1984, who considered it correlative with the lower part of the Madera Formation. However, in 2004, Kues and Giles recommended restricting the Madera Group to shelf and marginal basin beds of Desmoinean (upper Moscovian) to early Virgilian age, which excluded the Porvenir Formation. Spencer G. Lucas and coinvestigators also exclude the Porvenir Formation from the Madera Group.

See also

 List of fossiliferous stratigraphic units in New Mexico
 Paleontology in New Mexico

References

Carboniferous formations of New Mexico
Carboniferous southern paleotropical deposits